Rajeev Chandrasekhar (born 31 May 1964) is an Indian politician of the Bharatiya Janata Party. He is the incumbent Minister of State for Skill Development and Entrepreneurship and Electronics and Information Technology of India. He is also an entrepreneur, technocrat and a member of parliament in the Rajya Sabha from BJP representing Karnataka. He served as National Spokesperson of BJP and was vice-chairman of the Kerala faction of the BJP-led coalition National Democratic Alliance.

Chandrasekhar served as Member of Parliamentary Standing Committee on Finance, Member of Public Accounts Committee (PAC), Member of the Joint Committee on Data Protection Bill, 2019 and Member of the Consultative Committee on MoE & IT, Ministry of Communications, Member of the Indian Council for World Affairs.

Chandrasekhar served as a member of the Parliament, Standing Committee on Defence, Consultative Committee on Finance, the Central Advisory Committee for the National Cadet Corps, Co-Chairman of District Development Coordination & Monitoring Committee, Bangalore Urban District. He served as member Rajya Sabha Select Committees for the GST and Real Estate bills.

Chandrasekhar is the founder and Advisor to the Board of Jupiter Capital Pvt. Ltd.

Early life and education
Rajeev was born to Malayali parents in Ahmedabad, Gujarat. His father M. K. Chandrasekhar was an Air Commodore  of the Indian Air Force and was trainer of Rajesh Pilot. His ancestral home is at Kondayur near Desamangalam in Thrissur district of Kerala.

Chandrasekhar studied in various schools across India, and studied electrical engineering at Manipal Institute of Technology. He obtained his master's degree in computer science in 1988 from the Illinois Institute of Technology in Chicago. He was handpicked by Vinod Dham to join Intel and worked there from 1988 to 1991. At Intel he was part of the architectural team that designed the i486 processor. He completed an advance management program from Harvard University.

Career

Entrepreneur
In 1991, after returning to India, Chadrasekhar married and joined his father-in-law's company, BPL Group. In 1994, he founded BPL Mobile. It was one of the major telecom companies in India then with license over places such as Mumbai. In July 2005, he sold his 64 percent stake in BPL Communications to Essar Group for US$1.1 billion.

Chandrasekhar founded Jupiter Capital in 2005, with an initial investment of US$100 million. The investment firm has investments and managed assets of over US$800 million in technology, media, hospitality, and entertainment.

In April 2013, Chandrasekhar was awarded an honorary doctorate by Visvesvaraya Technological University, Belgaum, for his work as an entrepreneur.

As per the affidavit submitted by Chandrasekhar before Election Commission of India on 2018, he has an annual income of 28 crores and family assets valued 65 crores. He also held equity shares in six unlisted companies: Vectra Consultancy Services, SPL Infotech PTE, Jupiter Global Infrastructure, Minsk Developers, RC Stocks & Securities and Sanguine New Media. In addition to this he indirectly has stakes in Axiscade Engineering Technologies, Jupiter Capital Private Limited, Mistral Technology Assystem Axiscades, Tayana Digital, Hindustan Infrastructure Projects & Engineering Pvt Ltd.

Media 
In late 2006, Chandrasekhar entered into a media foray due to investments made in Asianet Communications Ltd. through his firm Jupiter Capital Private Limited. In late 2008, he entered into a joint venture with Rupert Murdoch's News Corp as Asianet Star Communications. In 2008 May, he started Asianet News Online Private Ltd. (ANOPL) which holds media outlets Asianet News, Suvarna News, and online portal Newsable. In 2016, through ANOPL, he invested nearly 60 crores in ARG Outlier Media, the holding company of Republic TV. In May 2019, ANOPL diluted the share holding in Republic TV after Chandrasekhar became a Member of Parliament, Rajya Sabha as Bharatiya Janata Party member in 2018.

Politics
Chandrasekhar is the Minister of Information Technology in the Modi government. Earlier he was a national spokesperson of BJP.

In Parliament vocal advocate on Governance, Technology and Economics. As a first-term MP, he was the first one to raise corruption like 2G Scam in parliament and is outspoken MP on issues that concern Governance.

Member of Parliament

Chandrasekhar was an Independent member of Rajya Sabha representing Karnataka from April 2006 to April 2018. In April 2018, he was re-elected to the Rajya Sabha from Karnataka for a third six-year term as a BJP member. He has advocated for governance reforms, institution building, Internet freedom, national security, welfare of the Armed Forces Personnel and sustainable city building of Bangalore and Karnataka.

Minister of State 
In the Second Modi ministry Chandrasekhar became a Minister of State following the cabinet reshuffling in July 2021.

Positions held

1999–2002 Member, Advisory Committee, Ministry of Information Technology, Government of India Chairman, Infrastructure Task Force, Government of Karnataka
1999–2003 Member, Prime Minister's Council on Trade and Development
Member of Parliament, Rajya Sabha
Member of Standing Committee on Defence
Member of Consultative Committee on Finance
Member of the Central Advisory Committee for the National Cadet Corps
Co-chairman of District Development Coordination & Monitoring Committee, Bangalore Urban District.
Founder and Advisor to the Board, Jupiter Capital Pvt. Ltd.
Founder and Principal Donor – Flags of Honour Foundation
Founder and Trustee, Namma Bengaluru Foundation
Founder and Managing Trustee – RC Foundation (RCF)

Personal life
Rajeev is married to Anju Chandrasekhar (m. 1991), the daughter of T. P. G. Nambiar, the founder of BPL Group and resides in Koramangala, Bengaluru. They have a son, Ved, and a daughter Devika. His mother Anandavalli Amma and father M. K. Chandrasekhar also reside in Bangalore.

Honours, awards and international recognition
Honoured by Army's Western Command GOC-in Commendation for his work for the Armed Forces and Veterans.
India Today magazine ranked him #41st in India's 50 Most powerful people of 2017 list.

References

Further reading

External links

Profile on Rajya Sabha website
Twitter handle

Living people
Indian billionaires
Indian computer scientists
Engineers from Karnataka
Malayali people
Politicians from Bangalore
Rajya Sabha members from Karnataka
Illinois Institute of Technology alumni
1964 births
Bharatiya Janata Party politicians from Karnataka
Rajya Sabha members from the Bharatiya Janata Party
Hudson Institute
Narendra Modi ministry